Oakcliff is a historic home located on Church Hill Road in Crescent, Saratoga County, New York.  It was built about 1840 and is two-story, three-bay timber framed, side hall residence in a formally balanced Greek Revival style. Renovations occurred in the late 1860s and late 1890s.  It has a two-story side wing. It features two-story porticos with four Tuscan order columns on each with full entablature and a molded triangular pediment.  Also on the property are a contributing frame carriage barn and stone wall.

It was added to the National Register of Historic Places in 1998.

References

Houses on the National Register of Historic Places in New York (state)
Greek Revival houses in New York (state)
Houses completed in 1840
Houses in Saratoga County, New York
National Register of Historic Places in Saratoga County, New York